Lebia marginata is a species of ground beetles in the Harpalinae subfamily that can be found in Austria, Belgium, Bulgaria, Czech Republic, Germany, Great Britain, Hungary, Italy, Liechtenstein, Luxembourg, Poland, Romania, Slovakia, Switzerland, Ukraine, Yugoslavian states (except for Croatia and North Macedonia), everywhere in Western Europe, and southern part of Russia.

References

Lebia
Beetles described in 1785
Beetles of Europe